Kesovce is a village and municipality in the Rimavská Sobota District of the Banská Bystrica Region of southern Slovakia. According to Slovakia 2021 census, more than 75% of inhabitants belong to Romani ethnic group.

Genealogical resources

The records for genealogical research are available at the state archive "Statny Archiv in Banska Bystrica, Slovakia"

 Roman Catholic church records (births/marriages/deaths): 1769-1896 (parish B)
 Lutheran church records (births/marriages/deaths): 1730-1895 (parish B)
 Reformated church records (births/marriages/deaths): 1778-1899 (parish A)

See also
 List of municipalities and towns in Slovakia

References

External links
https://web.archive.org/web/20080111223415/http://www.statistics.sk/mosmis/eng/run.html
Surnames of living people in Kesovce

Villages and municipalities in Rimavská Sobota District